William O. West  (August 15, 1853 – October 27, 1928), was a professional baseball player who played second base for the 1874 Brooklyn Atlantics and 1876 New York Mutuals.

References

External links

1853 births
1928 deaths
Brooklyn Atlantics players
New York Mutuals players
Major League Baseball second basemen
Baseball players from New York (state)
People from Williamsburg, Brooklyn
19th-century baseball players
Burials at Cypress Hills Cemetery
Pittsburgh Allegheny players
Manchester (minor league baseball) players